Copperlode Falls Dam or Lake Morris is a fresh water reservoir dam in Lamb Range, Cairns Region, Queensland, Australia, servicing the city of Cairns. The dam is located in the range immediately west of Cairns.

History
Originally Cairns' water needs were met with water drawn from Freshwater Creek and Behana Creek. It was evident to even the earliest settlers that a larger source of water would need to be secured as Cairns grew.

With this in mind, one of the city's engineers, F Morris, explored the Lamb Range to the west of the city to find a place to build a dam. In 1935 he found a site at Copperlode falls, near the headwaters of Freshwater Creek, that he thought would be suitable. Many years later, after a series of surveys confirmed the site's suitability, the Queensland Government approved the site for construction of an earth and rock fill dam.

The State Government originally set aside A$3 million for the dam, but by the time the dam was completed on 25 March 1976, the total cost had risen to approximately $6.5 million. The reservoir holds 38,475 megalitres of water (in comparison to Lake Tinaroo's 407,000 megalitres).

A reinforced masonry wall was added to the dam crest in 1993 to prevent waves from overtopping the wall in the event of extreme floods.

The reservoir is named Lake Morris after Cairns City engineer Frank Roland Morris who discovered its site, but the dam itself is named after the waterfalls it replaced - Copperlode Falls.

Daily updates on water levels can be found at http://www.cairns.qld.gov.au/water-waste-roads/water/water-sources-supply via a link to "CRC Water Summary Report". Historical data is not yet available at this site.

See also
Crystal Cascades
Barron River

References

External links
Cairns Water - History of Copperlode Dam

Buildings and structures in Far North Queensland
Reservoirs in Queensland
Dams completed in 1976
Dams in Queensland